Grabtown is an unincorporated community in Johnston County, North Carolina, United States. It is included in the Research Triangle Metropolitan Statistical Area.

Notable people
 Ava Gardner (1922–1990), born in Grabtown, American actress

See also

List of unincorporated communities in North Carolina

References

Research Triangle
Unincorporated communities in Johnston County, North Carolina
Unincorporated communities in North Carolina